Lewis Anderson was an American baseball catcher in the Negro leagues. He played with the Chicago American Giants in 1930 and the Baltimore Black Sox in 1933.

References

External links
 and Baseball-Reference Black Baseball Stats and  Seamheads 

Baltimore Black Sox players
Chicago American Giants players
Year of birth unknown
Year of death unknown
Baseball catchers